Augusto Gerardo Junco Tassinari (3 October 1915 – 9 December 1983), known professionally as Tito Junco, was a Mexican actor. He was considered one of the greatest actors of the Golden Age of Mexican cinema.

During his career, Junco appeared in about 200 films and received an Ariel Award nomination for his supporting performance in the 1948 film Que Dios me perdone.

Selected filmography
 The Count of Monte Cristo (1942)
 Red Konga (1943)
 María Magdalena: Pecadora de Magdala (1946)
 Reina de reinas: La Virgen María (1948)
 Cuatro contra el mundo (1950)
 Our Lady of Fatima (1951)
 Remember to Live (1953)
 Where Are Our Children Going? (1958)
 The Life of Agustín Lara (1959)
 Spicy Chile (1983)

References

External links 

1915 births
1983 deaths
Mexican male film actors
20th-century Mexican male actors
Male actors from Veracruz
Mexican people of Italian descent